Sady nad Torysou is a new village and municipality in Košice-okolie District in the Kosice Region of eastern Slovakia.

History
The municipality was established only in 1964. In fact, the village is formed by two localities: Byster and Zdoba. Byster  and Zdoba, respectively  first mentioned in 1332 (Bester), and in 1337 (Zdoba) in historical records belonged to Krásna pri Hornádom's Benedictine abbey.
In 1337, German settlers established in Byster (Peyster).

Geography
The village lies at an altitude of 207 metres and covers an area of 8.445 km².
It has a population of about 1700 people.

External links

http://www.cassovia.sk/sadynt/

Villages and municipalities in Košice-okolie District